Wardell George Westby (died 1756), of Ravenfield, Yorkshire, was a British politician who sat in the House of Commons from 1727 to 1731.

Westby was the eldest son of Thomas Westby, MP  of Ravenfield and his first wife  Margaret Wardell, daughter of George (Matthew?) Wardell of Holderness, Yorkshire. He married Charlotte Darcy, daughter of Hon. John Darcy on 30 May 1723, on which occasion his father gave up to him the Ravenfield estate, which had been in the family since the early seventeenth century.

At the 1727 British general election Westby was returned as Member of Parliament for Malton on the Wentworth Woodhouse interest. He voted with the Government and in 1731 he was appointed Commissioner of customs. He then vacated his seat, retaining the customs post for the rest of his life. He was also appointed a director of the Royal African Company in 1731.

Westby succeeded his father in. 1747 but he was  forced to sell Ravenfield in 1748 on account of his wife's extravagance. In 1749 he also sold a house at 5 Whitehall Yard, London.  He died  on 9 December 1756, leaving one daughter who married a cousin of the Earl of Egmont in 1750. Westby's widow died  in Great Marlborough Street on 10 February 1760, and of his daughter it was said ‘Let the remainer of her unhappy story be left in oblivion’.

External links
Grosvenor Prints Ravenfield near Doncaster in York Shire, the Seat of Wardell George Westby Esq.

References

 

1756 deaths
Members of the Parliament of Great Britain for English constituencies
British MPs 1727–1734